Gerald Antonio Riggs (born November 6, 1960) is an American former professional football player who was a running back in the National Football League (NFL) for the Atlanta Falcons from 1982 to 1988 and the Washington Redskins from 1989 to 1991.

Before his NFL career, he attended Bonanza High School in Las Vegas, Nevada and after graduation attended Arizona State University in Tempe, Arizona. He played sparingly in 1978, running for 410 yards and four touchdowns along with 10 catches for 126 yards. In 1979, he ran for 363 yards with three touchdowns and 14 catches for 120 yards and one touchdown. In 1980, he continued in a backup role and ran for 422 yards with four touchdowns with 15 catches for 165 yards. As a starter in 1981, he ran for 891 yards with six touchdowns and an average of six yards per carry, while also recording 11 catches for 139 yards in 11 games.

He would close out his collegiate career with 2,086 yards and 17 touchdowns on the ground and 50 catches for 550 yards.  In the 1982 NFL draft, he was selected with the 9th overall pick by Atlanta.

Riggs made the Pro Bowl three times in his career from 1985 to 1987.  His best season was in 1985, when he rushed for 1,719 yards and ten touchdowns, while also catching 33 passes for 267 yards, all without a fumble.  He was the only running back in the 1980s to record a 1,000 yard rushing season without a fumble.  In the three seasons from 1984 to 1986, Riggs amassed a whopping 5,212 combined rushing and receiving yards, and scored 32 touchdowns.  In his seven years with the Falcons, he rushed for 6,631 yards, making him the franchise all-time leading rusher. Prior to the 1989 season, Riggs was traded to the Washington Redskins.

In his final year of 1991, Riggs rushed for 248 yards and 11 touchdowns, assisting his team to a 14–2 record.  He is the only player to rush for 11 touchdowns in fewer than 80 attempts in a single season.  He went on to rush for four touchdowns in Washington's two playoff games, and two touchdowns in Washington's 37–24 win over the Buffalo Bills in Super Bowl XXVI; it was the last game he played in. His six touchdowns in the postseason tied an NFL record.

Riggs finished his 10 NFL seasons with 8,188 rushing yards and 69 touchdowns, along with 201 receptions for 1,516 yards.

He is the father of Gerald Riggs, Jr., former running back at the University of Tennessee, who played for the Miami Dolphins, and Cody Riggs, a cornerback for the Tennessee Titans.

References

External links
 Gerald Riggs career stats

1960 births
Living people
American football running backs
Arizona State Sun Devils football players
Atlanta Falcons players
Washington Redskins players
National Conference Pro Bowl players
Sportspeople from Las Vegas
Players of American football from Nevada